Gazelle (Elle) is a fictional character, a superhero appearing in American comic books published by Marvel Comics. The character appears in the NEW-GEN comic books. Created by Chris Matonti, J.D. Matonti, and Julia Coppola, she first appeared in NEW-GEN #1 (2010). He was one of the children from the world of NEW-GEN granted extraordinary abilities by Deadalus' nanobot infestation. She is a founding member of the A.P.N.G. superhero team.

Fictional character biography

Early life
Gazelle is a New-Gen native, and was very young when Gabriel's apprentice, Deadalus, turned loose a massive swarm of nanobots capable of reorganizing the genetic structures of those with whom they come into contact. Gazelle's body was drastically affected by the nanobots, giving her double jointed legs, a coat of fur, long horns and hoofed feet. After her mutation, Gabriel took Gazelle in and began to train her in the proper and responsible use of her powers.

Training with A.P.N.G.
As Gazelle got older she, along with the other members of the A.P.N.G. was schooled by Gabriel and his wife, Thea, in a variety of academic subjects. Additionally, she took part in training sessions in combat and tactics led by Mini in order to hone her skills for battle. Through these training sessions she fostered a very strong friendship and rivalry with Flyer, with whom she competes constantly in contests of speed.

Battle with Sly
After Sly was banished back to the underworld when Mini beat him, he eventually found a way to again burrow his way through the fabric of the universe onto Zadaar IV with his army of MetalMites and microbots. Gazelle was sent to dispatch him, after Sly's forces proved to powerful for Mini on his own. Gazelle destroyed several MetalMites by picking them apart piece by piece before they could retaliate effectively. After dodging a rogue plasma blast from Roboduck, she was able to destroy a particularly huge MetalMite by throwing Diamond through it at high speed. Sly then used a specialized energy blast which deactivated the nanobots inside the A.P.N.G., causing Gazelle to revert to her human form, leaving her powerless and exhausted. Gabriel teleported to Zadaar IV in order to help his team, and gave each member of the A.P.N.G. a nano-glove, containing nanobots which restore their powers and strength. As Gabriel fought Sly, Gazelle regained her strength and speed. Working as a team, the A.P.N.G. destroys the rest of then MetalMites, eventually emerging victorious and returning home to New-Gen.

Powers, abilities and equipment
Gazelle's body underwent a severe transformation as a result of Deadalus' nanobot infection. She now appears to be a humanoid gazelle, with horns, double jointed legs, a long snout, hooves, long ears, and fur. The nanobots also gave Gazelle super speed, able to run significantly faster than most vehicles on New-Gen, and fast enough to attack from seemingly many places at once. She also may possess a measure of increased strength, as she is able to run at full speed while carrying a team member.

References

External links 
 https://web.archive.org/web/20110707153446/http://apngenterprises.com/comic/characters-of-new-gen/
 http://www.comicvine.com/gazelle/29-74397/

Marvel Comics characters who can move at superhuman speeds